This is a list of roundabouts in the state of Massachusetts in the United States. Intersections that are called traffic circles or roundabouts in the rest of the US are referred to as "rotaries" in Massachusetts, as well as other parts of New England including parts of Connecticut, New Hampshire, Maine & Vermont.

In 2017 the MassDOT announced that it was eliminating rotaries in favor of Roundabouts.  In 2020 it issued guidance on the design and planning for roundabouts.

City of Boston
Sullivan Square (Interstate 93/U.S. Route 1, Massachusetts Route 99, Massachusetts Route 38 Alford St., and Main St.)  in Charlestown, Boston
Orient Heights (Saratoga St., Boardman St., and Ford St) in East Boston
Old Colony Rotary in South Boston
Columbia Point Rotary (Southeast Expressway:Interstate 93/U.S. Route 1/Massachusetts Route 3)
Neponset Circle (Southeast Expressway:Interstate 93/U.S. Route 1/Massachusetts Route 3, Morrissey Boulevard and Massachusetts Route 203) in Dorchester, Boston
Morrissey Boulevard in Dorchester, Boston
Hyde Square (Centre Street, Day Street, Perkins Street) in Jamaica Plain
General Heath Square (Heath Street, Parker Street, Wensley Street, New Heath Street) in Jamaica Plain

City of Cambridge
Alewife Brook Parkway (Massachusetts Route 2, Massachusetts Route 16, and US Route 3) with Concord Ave, in West Cambridge, in a rotary interchange built in a small space.
Dawes Island Park Massachusetts Avenue (Massachusetts Route 2A) Peabody, and Garden Streets in Harvard Square, in an elongated configuration due to portal into Harvard Square Bus Tunnel
Fresh Pond Parkway (Massachusetts Route 2, Massachusetts Route 16, and US Route 3) with Concord Ave, in West Cambridge, in a rotary interchange built in a small space.
Memorial Drive (U.S. Route 3) & Boston University Bridge (Massachusetts Route 2), Cambridge, Massachusetts, in a rotary interchange built in a small space.

Elsewhere in Massachusetts

Airport Rotary, Massachusetts Route 28 and Massachusetts Route 132 in Hyannis, Massachusetts
Route 111 and Route 113 in Pepperell, Massachusetts.
Route 111 and Route 2A in Ayer, Massachusetts.
Route 12 and I-290 in Sterling, Massachusetts
 Saugus Center and Civil War Memorial
Cliftondale Center a small quintessentially New England rotary located in Saugus, Massachusetts
West Main St. and North St. in Hyannis, Massachusetts
 Orleans Circle U.S. Route 6 at Massachusetts Route 6A/Massachusetts Route 28 in Orleans, Massachusetts
Massachusetts Route 2 & Pearson Boulevard, Gardner, Massachusetts, is a rotary interchange. 
Massachusetts Route 2 & Massachusetts Route 68, Gardner, Massachusetts, is a rotary interchange.
Interstate 91, Massachusetts Route 2, and Massachusetts Route 2A all meet at a grade-separated rotary interchange in Greenfield. (Exit 26 of I-91)
Massachusetts Route 3 & Union Street, Braintree, Massachusetts, is an oval shaped rotary interchange. 
Roosevelt Circle (Interstate 93, Route 28 & S Border Road), in Medford, Massachusetts, is an oval shaped rotary interchange. 
Medford Square Rotary (Interstate 93, Massachusetts Route 60, and Ring Road) in Medford, Massachusetts
State Route 60 (a.k.a. High St.) and Mystic Valley Parkway and Arlington Street, in Medford, Massachusetts. No state "rotary" sign marks this rotary immediately east of the Mystic River, the boundary with Town of Arlington. Immediately west of the Mystic River bridge, about 200 feet away, is the Route 60 rotary in Arlington, which is marked by state "rotary" signs. The pair of rotaries connects Mystic Valley Parkway roads adjacent to Mystic Lake in each city.
Interstate 95 & U.S. Route 20, Waltham, Massachusetts, is a large rotary interchange with the on ramps inside the rotary. 
Interstate 95 (wrong-way concurrency with US Route 1) & Canton Street, East Street and Allied Drive in Westwood, Massachusetts, is a rotary of surface streets with ramps leading to and from the highway below.
Mass Route 147 and US Route 5 (as a highway) in West Springfield, Massachusetts, is an open circle rotary with access ramps leading to and from the highway below.
US Route 20 and US Route 5 (as a highway) in West Springfield, Massachusetts, is a tunnel style rotary with a mini park in the center where the highway passes through the tunnel. Access ramps leading to and from the highway are provided. 
US Route 5, State Route 57 (Massachusetts), and River Road in Agawam, Massachusetts, is a rotary of River Road and Route 57 with US Route 5 (as a highway) as an overpass with access ramps to and from Route 57. It is notorious for near misses due to the awkward ramp configuration. 
Cape Cod Rail Trail rotary in Harwich, Massachusetts 
Grant Circle (Route 128 and Route 127) in Gloucester, Massachusetts, dangerous rotary as it interrupts Route 128 just after the A. Piatt Andrew Bridge, where it is not uncommon to see people driving at highway speeds not yield to traffic on the rotary despite various warnings.
Blackburn Circle (Massachusetts Route 128, School House Rd. and Dory Rd.) in Gloucester, Massachusetts large rotary where most of the traffic is continuing traffic along Route 128
Bell Circle (Massachusetts Route 16, Massachusetts Route 60, Massachusetts Route 1A, and Beach Street) in Revere, Massachusetts notorious for having a high accident rate
Monument Square, Massachusetts Route 62, Concord, Massachusetts
Brown Circle (Massachusetts Route 60, and Massachusetts Route 107) in Revere, Massachusetts
Copeland Circle (U.S. Route 1, Massachusetts Route 60, and Abandoned interchange to Interstate 95 Interstate 695 (Massachusetts)) in Revere, Massachusetts
MA Route 129 Rotary at MA Route 128(Interstate 95/Massachusetts Route 128, and Massachusetts Route 129) in Wakefield, Massachusetts, and Reading, Massachusetts exit 40
Santili Circle Massachusetts Route 16 (Revere Beach Parkway) at Gateway Center shopping plaza, in Everett, Massachusetts
Sweetser Circle Massachusetts Route 16, Massachusetts Route 99 Site of the Abenaqui Tanker explosion. in Everett, Massachusetts
(Interstate 95 (Massachusetts Route 128), and Massachusetts Route 38 in Woburn, Massachusetts
Woburn Center (Massachusetts Route 38, Winn Street, Pleasant Street, and Montvale Avenue) in Woburn, Massachusetts, somewhat triangular shaped rotary
Goodwin Circle - Lynnfield Street Rotary (Interstate 95/Massachusetts Route 128, U.S. Route 1, Massachusetts Route 129 Salem Street Lynnfield, Lynnfield Street Lynn, and Lynnfield Street Peabody in Lynn, Massachusetts, Lynnfield, Massachusetts, and Peabody, Massachusetts
Hingham Circle (Massachusetts Route 3A, Summer Street and Green Street) in Hingham, Massachusetts
Mashpee Circle (Massachusetts Route 28, Massachusetts Route 151 and Great Neck Road) in Mashpee, Massachusetts
Middleboro Circle (U.S. Route 44, Massachusetts Route 18 and Massachusetts Route 28) in Middleborough, Massachusetts
Massachusetts Route 85 and Broad St. in Hudson, Massachusetts
Massachusetts Route 18, Massachusetts Route 28 and Massachusetts Route 104 in Bridgewater, Massachusetts, signed as a rotary but is two parallel streets carrying the three highways with two cross roads completing the rotary at the north and south ends
Plymouth Rotary (Water Street, South Park Avenue and Town Wharf) in Plymouth Center, Massachusetts, 0.2 miles east of the junction of U.S. Route 44 and Massachusetts Route 3A
Massachusetts Route 3, Furnace Brook Parkway and Willard Street in Quincy, Massachusetts, is a rotary interchange
Massachusetts Route 3A, Wharf Street, Dee Road, and the access road to the Fore River Shipyard and the United States Naval Shipbuilding Museum, at the north (west) end of the Fore River Bridge, in Quincy, Massachusetts
Massachusetts Route 3A, Massachusetts Route 123, New Driftway, and Country Way in Scituate, Massachusetts
Interstate 93, Massachusetts Route 110 and Massachusetts Route 113 in Methuen, Massachusetts. Rotary will be replaced with a partial cloverleaf starting in mid-2013, with completion of new interchange and demolition of rotary set for early 2017. 
Whitman Circle (Massachusetts Route 58, Essex Street and Raynor Avenue) in Whitman, Massachusetts
Bourne Circle (Massachusetts Route 28 and Trowbridge Rd), at the south end of the Bourne Bridge in Bourne, Massachusetts
Buzzards Bay Circle (U.S. Route 6, Massachusetts Route 28, Head of the Bay Road, and the ramp to Massachusetts Route 25 west and Massachusetts Route 28 south (the Bourne Bridge)) in Buzzards Bay, Massachusetts, east of the village
U.S. Route 6, Massachusetts Route 28 and access road leading to Lincoln Avenue in Buzzards Bay, Massachusetts, west of the village 
Winchester Center (Mt Vernon Street, Shore Road, Park Street, and Main Street and the Boston to Lowell Line of the MBTA Commuter Rail) in Winchester, Massachusetts
Shaker Road (Connecticut Route 220), Maple Street, North Main Street (Massachusetts Route 83), Elm Street, Pleasant Street, Somers Road (Connecticut Route 83), and Prospect Street in East Longmeadow, Massachusetts,
Massachusetts Route 140, in Foxborough, Massachusetts, is a large rotary around the town common intersecting with Cocasset Street, Mechanic Street, South Street, Bird Street, Rockhill Street and Central Street.
U.S. Route 6 in Fall River, Massachusetts and Exit 5 of Massachusetts Route 24 meet in a rotary.
Massachusetts Route 103 in Somerset, Massachusetts, travels along Wilbur Avenue and meets with Riverside Avenue and Brayton Avenue in a rotary at the former location of the Slade's Ferry Bridge just 0.2 miles south of its terminus.
U.S. Route 7 and Massachusetts Route 2 in Williamstown, Massachusetts.
Main Street in Westborough, Massachusetts.
Electric Avenue and the name change between Rollstone Street and Rollstone Road in Fitchburg, Massachusetts.
Natick Mall area has 3 Rotaries: One at Flutie Pass and Natick Mall Road over by Macy's. Another at the intersection of Flutie Pass, Nouvelle Way, and Natick Mall Road over by Wegmans. And another Rotary on Natick Mall Road in between former Sears Entrance and Nordstrom Entrance (recently completed in 2018).
Mass. Route 2 in West Concord, next to MCI-Concord ("The Reformatory").
US Route 202 in South Hadley, Massachusetts
U.S. Route 1 and State Street in Newburyport, Massachusetts
U.S. Route 1 & Nahatan Street and Neponset Street in Norwood, Massachusetts is a rotary of surface streets with ramps leading to and from the highway below.

References

Roundabouts and traffic circles in the United States
Transportation in Massachusetts
Road interchanges in Massachusetts